Pyeongtaek–Paju Expressway (평택–파주 고속 도로) is an expressway in South Korea. It connects Pyeongtaek to Paju in Gyeonggi Province. The expressway's route number is 17, which it shares with the Iksan–Pyeongtaek Expressway. This expressway overlaps with the Capital Region Second Ring Expressway at Hwaseong.

History 
 3 Nov 2004 : #411. Pyeongtaek–Hwaseong Expressway was designated
 3 Jan 2008 : Pyeongtaek–Hwaseong Expressway was split to #17. Pyeongtaek–Hwaseong Expressway and #171. Osan–Hwaseong Expressway; and #17. Suwon–Gwangmyeong Expressway was designated
 17 Nov 2008 : Suwon–Gwangmyeong Expressway was renamed to #17. Suwon–Munsan Expressway
 29 Oct 2009 : Pyeongtaek–Hwaseong segment was opened to traffic
 29 Apr 2016 : Suwon–Gwangmyeong segment except Soha IC was opened to traffic
 3 Jul 2016 : Soha IC was opened to traffic
 12 Jan 2018 : Pyeongtaek–Hwaseong Expressway and Suwon–Munsan Expressway were merged to #17. Pyeongtaek–Paju Expressway

Compositions

Lanes 
 W. Osan JC – S. Gunpo IC; S. Gwangmyeong IC – Seongchae IC/Soha IC: 4 lanes
 Oseong IC – W. Osan JC; S. Gunpo IC – S. Gwangmyeong IC: 6 lanes

Length 
 Pyeongtaek – Hwaseong: 26.7 km
 Suwon – Gwangmyeong: 27.38 km
 Gwangmyeong – Seoul: 17.9 km
 Seoul – Munsan: 35.6 km

Speed limit 
 100 km/h

List of facilities

IC: Interchange, JC: Junction, SA: Service Area, TG: Tollgate
 Light purple (■): Capital Region Second Ring Expressway overlap
 Light green (■): Capital Region Second Ring Expressway and Local Route 309 overlap
 Light blue (■): Local Route 309 overlap

Main Section (Pyeongtaek-Gwangmyeong, Seoul-Paju)

S.Gwnagmyeong - Soha Branch line

S.Goyang - Bongdaesan Branch line

Major stopovers 
 Gyeonggi Province 
 Pyeongtaek (Oseong-myeon - Cheongbuk-eup) - Hwaseong (Yanggam-myeon) - Pyeongtaek (Seotan-myeon) - Hwaseong (Yanggam-myeon) - Pyeongtaek (Seotan-myeon) - Hwaseong (Yanggam-myeon) - Pyeongtaek (Seotan-myeon) - Hwaseong (Yanggam-myeon) - Pyeongtaek (Seotan-myeon) - Hwaseong (Yanggam-myeon - Hyangnam-eup) - Pyeongtaek (Seotan-myeon) - Hwaseong (Jeongnam-myeon) - Osan (Seorang-dong) - Hwaseong (Jeongnam-myeon - Bongdam-eup - Maesong-myeon) - Suwon Gwonseon-gu (Homaesil-dong - Geumgok-dong - Dangsu-dong) - Ansan Sangnok-gu (Sasa-dong) - Gunpo (Domagyo-dong - Bugok-dong - Daeyami-dong - Sokdal-dong) - Ansan Sangnok-gu (Suam-dong) - Siheung (Jonam-dong - Mokgam-dong - Nongok-dong) - Gwangmyeong (Gahak-dong - Noonsa-dong - Gwangmyeong-dong - Okgil-dong) - Bucheon (Okgil-dong)
 Branch 1: Gwangmyeong (Gahak-dong - Soha-dong)
 Seoul
 Guro District (Hang-dong)
 Gyeonggi Province
 Bucheon (Goean-dong - Yeokgok-dong)
 Seoul
 Guro District (Onsu-dong)
 Gyeonggi Province
 Bucheon (Chunui-dong - Jak-dong)
 Seoul
 Yangcheon District (Sinwol-dong)
 Gyeonggi Province
 Bucheon (Gogang-dong)
 Seoul
 Yangcheon District (Sinwol-dong)
 Gyeonggi Province
 Bucheon (Gogang-dong)
 Seoul
 Gangseo District (Oebalsan-dong - Gonghang-dong - Banghwa-dong)
 Gyeonggi Province
 Goyang Deogyang-gu (Gangmae-dong - Haengsin-dong - Donae-dong - Seongsa-dong - Hwajeong-dong - Seongsa-dong - Wondang-dong) - Ilsandong-gu (Sarihyeon-dong - Munbong-dong - Siksa-dong - Munbong-dong - Seongseok-dong - Seolmun-dong) - Paju (Jori-eup - Geumneung-dong - Adong-dong - Wollong-myeon - Paju-eup - Munsan-eup)
 Branch 2: Goyang Deogyang-gu (Deogeun-dong - Hyeoncheon-dong)

See also
Expressways in South Korea
Transport in South Korea

References

External links
 Gyeonggi Expressway Co., Ltd.
 Metropolitan Western Expressway Co., Ltd.
 MOLIT South Korean Government Transport Department

Expressways in South Korea
Transport in Gyeonggi Province
Roads in Gyeonggi